Atlantihyla panchoi, also known as the Guatemala stream frog, is a species of frog in the family Hylidae. It is endemic to eastern Guatemala and is only known from three localities in the Sierra de las Minas and Montañas del Mico ranges. The specific name panchoi honors , an American herpetologist.

Description
Adult males measure  and adult females, based on a single specimen,  in snout–vent length. The snout is rounded but has a pointed tip in dorsal view because of a vertical rostral keel. The tympanum is round but its upper edge is obscured by the heavy supratympanic fold. The fingers bear large discs and are up to about half webbed. The toes are almost fully webbed and bear discs somewhat smaller than the fingers ones. The dorsal ground color is grayish tan with green flecks (especially prominent on the eyelids, sometimes completely ringed by them) and darker brown mottling, or dark brown with darker gray brown markings. There is a white stripe on the edge of the upper lip and a white spot below the eye. A distinctive white stripe runs from above axilla along the flanks to the groin, becoming fragmented posteriorly. The throat, chest, belly and ventral surfaces of the limbs are pale yellow with scattered dark brown flecks. The iris is blood orange.

A tadpole of Gosner stage 30 measures  in total length, of which almost three quarters is the tail.

Habitat and conservation
It often occurs along streams, and does not occur in degraded habitats. Breeding takes place in streams.

Though once relatively easy to find in suitable habitat, this species is now uncommon and may already have been extirpated from its type locality. It is threatened by habitat loss caused by expanding agriculture, wood extraction, and human settlement, as well as by water pollution and chytridiomycosis. It has been recorded in two protected areas, Sierra de las Minas biosphere reserve and Reserva Protector de Mantanial Cerro de San Gil (Sierra del Mico).

References

Critically endangered fauna of North America
Atlantihyla
Frogs of North America
Amphibians of Guatemala
Endemic fauna of Guatemala
Amphibians described in 1982
Taxa named by Jonathan A. Campbell
Taxa named by William Edward Duellman
Taxonomy articles created by Polbot